is an interchange passenger railway station in located in the city of Hirakata, Osaka, Japan, operated by the private railway operator, Keihan Electric Railway. It is numbered "KH21".

Lines
Hirakatashi Station is served by the Keihan Main Line and is located 21.8 km from the starting point of the line at Yodoyabashi Station. It is also a terminus of the 6.9 kilometer Keihan Katano Line to Katano Station.

Layout
The station has three elevated island platforms serving six tracks located on the third-floor level of the station building.

Platforms

Adjacent stations

History
It was renamed Hirakatashi on 1 October 1949.

Passenger statistics
In fiscal 2019, the station was used by an average of 96,604 passengers daily.

Surrounding area
Hirakata City Hall
Keihan Hirakata Station Mall (Keihan Department Store Hirakata)
HirakataT-SEIT
Hirakata City Arts Center( Under construction)
Kansai Medical University
 Kansai Medical University Hospital

See also
 List of railway stations in Japan

References

External links

 Keihan Station information 

Railway stations in Osaka Prefecture
Railway stations in Japan opened in 1910
Hirakata, Osaka